Helvella fibrosa is a species of fungi in the family Helvellaceae of the order Pezizales. It was formerly known as Octospora villosa, originally described by Hedwig in 1789, and was placed in a number of different genera throughout the decades, including Peziza, Fuckelina, and Cyathipodia. H. fibrosa has also been incorrectly named H. villosa, H. chinensis, and H. dissingii. The current species name was proposed by Richard Korf in 2008.

References

fibrosa